Aprominta is a Palearctic moth genus in the family Autostichidae. One species Aprominta australis Gozmány, 1966 is Afrotropical.

Species
 Aprominta africana Gozmány, 1961
 Aprominta afrogypsa Gozmány, 1988
 Aprominta aga Gozmány, 1962
 Aprominta aladdin Gozmány, 1963
 Aprominta aperitta Gozmány, 1997
 Aprominta arenbergeri Gozmány, 1969
 Aprominta argonauta Gozmány, 1964
 Aprominta atricanella (Rebel, 1906)
 Aprominta australis Gozmány, 1966
 Aprominta bifasciata (Staudinger, 1870)
 Aprominta cryptogamarum (Millière, 1872)
 Aprominta designatella (Herrich-Schäffer, 1855)
 Aprominta gloriosa Gozmány, 1959
 Aprominta marthae Gozmány, 2000
 Aprominta pannosella (Rebel, 1906)
 Aprominta reisseri Gozmány, 1959
 Aprominta separata Gozmány, 1961
 Aprominta syriacella (Ragonot, 1895)
 Aprominta tectaphella (Rebel, 1916)
 Aprominta xena Gozmány, 1959
 Aprominta yatagan Gozmány, 2008

References

 
Symmocinae
Moth genera